Ridhora is a village panchayat in the state of Madhya Pradesh in India.

References

Villages in Betul district